Ormeau railway station is a railway station located on the Gold Coast line in Queensland, Australia. It serves the Gold Coast suburb of Pimpama.

History
Ormeau station opened on 25 February 1996 when the Gold Coast line opened from Beenleigh to Helensvale. It is the only station on the Gold Coast line with side platforms.

Services
Ormeau is served by Gold Coast line services from Varsity Lakes to Bowen Hills, Doomben and Brisbane Domestic Airport.

Services by platform

Transport links
Surfside Buslines operate four routes from Ormeau station:
721: to Coomera station via Upper Coomera
722: to Coomera station via Pimpama
728: to Beenleigh station via Yatala
729: to Beenleigh station via Ormeau Hills

References

External links

Ormeau station Queensland Rail
Oremeau station Queensland's Railways on the Internet

Railway stations in Australia opened in 1996
Railway stations in Gold Coast City